Jonavos Senamiesčio gimnazija is a public gymnasium in Jonava, Lithuania. It was founded in 1998 and includes grades 9–12. Its institution code is 190302622. The gymnasium's anthem was changed several times because of politic structure changes in Lithuania. The current anthem was recognized in 2001.

Headmasters
1974: A. Katinas;
1998: I. Šidlauskaitė Banevičienė;
1999: Rita Čiužienė;
Current: Darius Mockus.

References

External links

Official Website

Schools in Jonava
Educational institutions established in 1974
Gymnasiums in Lithuania